Jung Hyun-Woo (born 24 April 1997), known professionally as Andy Jung, is a South Korean-born professional short track speed skating athlete residing in Melbourne, Victoria. Jung represented Australia at the 2018 Winter Olympics, where he competed in the Men's 1500m event as well as the Men's 500 metres.

Career
In the Men's 1500m event at the 2018 Winter Olympics, his first competition at the Olympic games, he finished in fourth place behind Canada's Charles Hamelin, Belgium's Jens Almey, and the United States' Aaron Tran. Both Jung and China's Han Tianyu, who placed fifth, advanced to the semifinal despite the top three quota due to the disqualification of Italy's Yuri Confortola, who collided with Tianyu during the race. The judges awarded a semifinal berth to Jung after the judges ruled that Jung was impeded by the collision. In the first semifinal of the event, Jung finished fifth behind Russia's Semion Elistratov, Hamelin, Korea's Seo Yira and Latvia's Roberto Puķītis. The top two placers, Elistratov and Hamelin qualified for the gold medal race and the third and fourth placers, Yira and Puķītis, qualified for the ranking final, while Jung failed to advance.
He also competed in the men's 500 metres at the 2018 Pyeongchang Olympics, where he slipped because of the American athlete, Aaron Tran, who pushed Andy’s blade. Aaron ended up receiving penalty, but unfortunately Andy came third and could not proceed to the next game.

Statistics

International competitions

See also

 List of Australian Winter Olympians

References
Notes

Citations

External links
 
 
 Andy Jung at the Olympic Winter Institute of Australia
 

1997 births
Living people
Australian male short track speed skaters
Olympic short track speed skaters of Australia
Short track speed skaters at the 2018 Winter Olympics
Short track speed skaters at the 2017 Asian Winter Games
Australian people of Korean descent